The 2007–08 North Carolina Tar Heels men's basketball team represented the University of North Carolina at Chapel Hill during the 2007–08 NCAA Division I men's basketball season. Their head coach was Roy Williams. The team played its home games in the Dean Smith Center in Chapel Hill, North Carolina as a member of the Atlantic Coast Conference.

Roster 

Note: During the December 27 game against Nevada, backup point guard Bobby Frasor was injured, requiring surgery and ending his season.

Schedule and results
The Tar Heels began the season ranked atop both major polls, and stayed there for the first two months of the season despite closer-than-expected games against Davidson and Clemson.  They suffered their first loss of the season against Maryland on January 19.  Three games later, point guard Ty Lawson twisted his ankle and missed most of February.  Despite this, the Tar Heels didn't miss a beat, going  8–1 the rest of the way. They regained the top spot in the polls in late February and held it for the rest of the season.  They clinched their 26th ACC regular season title by avenging their earlier loss to Duke in the last game of the season.

In the ACC Tournament held in Charlotte, the top-seeded Tar Heels defeated Florida State, Virginia Tech and Clemson to win their 17th conference tournament title.  In so doing, they went into the NCAA Tournament with a 32–2 record—the most wins going into the tourney in school history.

In the NCAA Tournament, the Tar Heels were seeded first in the East Regional, and were also the overall top seed in the tournament.  They routed Mount St. Mary's and Arkansas while playing just 30 minutes from campus at the RBC Center in Raleigh.  They were no less dominant in the regional phase in Charlotte, scoring convincing wins over Washington State and Louisville to make their 17th trip to the Final Four, but in their national semifinal game, they lost to Kansas, who went on to win the national championship.  Remarkably, the Tar Heels made the Final Four while not having to leave the state of North Carolina for a little over a month (a total of 10 games), and while notching two losses at the Smith Center—an arena where they have traditionally been all but unbeatable.  They also set a school record for wins in a season, with 36.  With Memphis having its 38-win 2007–08 season vacated by the NCAA, the 2007–08 Tar Heels' 36 wins are now the second-most in Division I history.

|-
!colspan=9| Exhibition

|-
!colspan=9| Regular Season

|-
!colspan=9| Las Vegas Invitational

|-
!colspan=9| 

|-
!colspan=9| ACC tournament

|-
!colspan=9| NCAA tournament

Team players drafted into the NBA

References 

North Carolina
NCAA Division I men's basketball tournament Final Four seasons
North Carolina Tar Heels men's basketball seasons
North Carolina
Tar
Tar